Bitush (also Romanized as Bītūsh and Beytūsh) is a village in Alan Rural District, in the Central District of Sardasht County, West Azerbaijan Province, Iran. At the 2006 census, its population was 1200, in 179 families.

References 

Populated places in Sardasht County